Shail Chaturvedi (29 June 1936 – 29 October 2007) was a Hindi poet, satirist, humorist, lyricist and actor from India, most known for his political satire in the 70s and the 80s.

He worked as a character actor in several Hindi films and TV series.

Career
He started his career as a lecturer at Allahabad University, soon started taking part in various Kavi sammelan (poetry gatherings), and with his tongue-in-cheek political commentary, made a place for himself amidst leading humorists, hasya kavi of the 1970s and 1980s, like Kaka Hathrasi, Pradeep Chaubey and Ashok Chakradhar.

He became a regular feature of the annual kavi sammelan one Doordarshan, state-run TV channel, around the Holi festival. He also acted in a number of Hindi films, like Uphaar (1971), Chitchor (1976), Chameli Ki Shaadi (1986) and Kareeb (1998). He played the role of "Sharma ji", the boss of Keshav and Gokhale in the famous sitcom Shrimaan Shrimati

He died on 29 October 2007, after suffering from chronic kidney failure for some time, and was  survived by his wife Daya and three sons.

Selected filmography

Films

Television

Works
 Bazar Ka Ye Hal Hai, Pub. Shri Hindi Sahitya Sansar, 1988.
 Chal Gayi, Fusion Books. .

References

External links
 
 
 Excerpt from Chal Gayi by Shail Chaturvedi

Hindi-language poets
2007 deaths
1936 births
Indian humorists
Indian satirists
Male actors in Hindi cinema
Indian male television actors
Academic staff of the University of Allahabad
Deaths from kidney failure
Indian male poets
20th-century Indian poets
20th-century Indian male actors
Poets from Maharashtra
Male actors from Maharashtra
20th-century Indian male writers